Gerry And Ziz was a Canadian music variety television series which aired on CBC Television in 1979.

Premise
This series was hosted by musicians Gerry Paquin and Gerard "Ziz" Jean, previously seen on Canadian Express. Jay Brazeau and David Gillies performed humour segments. Joan Armatrading, Leon Bibb, Charity Brown, Pauline Julien, Denise McCann, Colleen Peterson, Graham Shaw and Valdy were among the visiting artists.

Production
Episodes were produced in Winnipeg by Marv Terhock with a live audience. Musical direction was by Ron Paley.

Scheduling
The half-hour series aired on Sundays at 10:00 p.m. (Eastern) from 8 July to 2 September 1979.

References

External links
 

CBC Television original programming
1979 Canadian television series debuts
1979 Canadian television series endings